Josef Berger may refer to:

 Josef Berger (field hockey), Austrian field hockey player
 Josef Berger (speechwriter) (1903–1971), American journalist, author and speechwriter
 Josef Berger (scientist) (born 1949), Czech scientist

See also
 Joseph Berger (disambiguation)